Middle Bass Island Airport  is a public airport located on Middle Bass Island in Ottawa County, Ohio, United States. It is owned by the Put-in-Bay Township Port Authority.

Facilities and aircraft 
Middle Bass Island Airport has one asphalt paved runway (10/28) measuring 1,852 x 75 ft. (564 x 23 m). For the 12-month period ending October 18, 2005, the airport had 6,500 aircraft operations, an average of 17 per day: 62% air taxi (4,000) and 38% general aviation.

References

External links 

Airports in Ohio
Transportation in Ottawa County, Ohio
Buildings and structures in Ottawa County, Ohio